Twelfth Night (also known as Epiphany Eve) is a Christian festival on the last night of the Twelve Days of Christmas, marking the coming of the Epiphany.

A superstition in some English-speaking countries suggests it is unlucky to leave Christmas decorations hanging after Twelfth Night, a tradition also variously attached to the festivals of Candlemas (2 February), Good Friday, Shrove Tuesday, and Septuagesima. Other popular customs include eating king cake, singing Christmas carols, chalking the door, having one's house blessed, merrymaking, and attending church services.

Date
In these traditions, Twelfth Night is the same as Epiphany. The difficulty may come from the use of the words "eve" which is defined as "the day or evening before an event", however, especially in antiquated usage could be used to simply mean "evening".

Bruce Forbes writes:In 567 the Council of Tours proclaimed that the entire period between Christmas and Epiphany should be considered part of the celebration, creating what became known as the twelve days of Christmas, or what the English called Christmastide. On the last of the twelve days, called Twelfth Night, various cultures developed a wide range of additional special festivities. The variation extends even to the issue of how to count the days. If Christmas Day is the first of the twelve days, then Twelfth Night would be on January 5, the eve of Epiphany. If December 26, the day after Christmas, is the first day, then Twelfth Night falls on January 6, the evening of Epiphany itself.

The Church of England, Mother Church of the Anglican Communion, celebrates Twelfth Night on the 5th and "refers to the night before Epiphany, the day when the nativity story tells us that the wise men visited the infant Jesus".

Origins and history 

In 567 A.D, the Council of Tours "proclaimed the twelve days from Christmas to Epiphany as a sacred and festive season, and established the duty of Advent fasting in preparation for the feast." Christopher Hill, as well as William J. Federer, states that this was done to solve the "administrative problem for the Roman Empire as it tried to coordinate the solar Julian calendar with the lunar calendars of its provinces in the east."

In medieval and Tudor England, Candlemas traditionally marked the end of the Christmas season, although later, Twelfth Night came to signal the end of Christmastide, with a new but related season of Epiphanytide running until Candlemas. A popular Twelfth Night tradition was to have a bean and pea hidden inside a Twelfth-night cake; the "man who finds the bean in his slice of cake becomes King for the night while the lady who finds a pea in her slice of cake becomes Queen for the night." Following this selection, Twelfth Night parties would continue and would include the singing of Christmas carols, as well as feasting.

Traditions 
Food and drink are the centre of the celebrations in modern times. All of the most traditional ones go back many centuries. The punch called wassail is consumed especially on Twelfth Night and throughout Christmas time, especially in the UK, and door-to-door wassailing (similar to singing Christmas carols) was common up until the 1950s. Around the world, special pastries, such as the tortell and king cake, are baked on Twelfth Night, and eaten the following day for the Feast of the Epiphany celebrations. In English and French custom, the Twelfth-cake was baked to contain a bean and a pea so that those who received the slices containing them should be respectively designated king and queen of the night's festivities.

In parts of Kent, there is a tradition that an edible decoration would be the last part of Christmas to be removed in the Twelfth Night and shared amongst the family.

The Theatre Royal, Drury Lane in London has had a tradition since 1795 of providing a Twelfth Night cake. The will of Robert Baddeley made a bequest of £100 to provide cake and punch every year for the company in residence at the theatre on 6 January. The tradition continues.

In Ireland, it is still the tradition to place the statues of the Three Kings in the crib on the Twelfth Night or, at the latest, the following day, Little Christmas.

In colonial America, a Christmas wreath was always left up on the front door of each home. When taken down at the end of the Twelve Days of Christmas, any edible portions would be consumed with the other foods of the feast. The same held true in the 19th–20th centuries with fruits adorning Christmas trees. Fresh fruits were hard to come by and were therefore considered fine and proper gifts and decorations for the tree, wreaths, and home. Again, the tree would be taken down on the Twelfth Night, and such fruits, along with nuts and other local produce used, would then be consumed. 

Modern American Carnival traditions are seen across former French colonies, most notably in New Orleans and Mobile. In the mid-twentieth century, friends gathered for weekly king cake parties. Whoever got the slice with the "king", usually in the form of a miniature baby doll (symbolic of the Christ Child, "Christ the King"), hosted the next week's party. Traditionally, this was a bean for the king and a pea for the queen. Parties centred around king cakes are no longer common and king cake today is usually brought to the workplace or served at parties, the recipient of the plastic baby being obligated to bring the next king cake to the next function. In some countries, Twelfth Night and Epiphany mark the start of the Carnival season, which lasts through Mardi Gras Day.

In Spain, Twelfth Night is called Cabalgata de Reyes ("Parade of Kings"), and historically the "kings" would go through towns and hand out sweets.

In France, La Galette des Rois ("Kings' Cake") is eaten all month long. The cakes vary depending on the region; in northern France, it is called a galette and is filled with frangipane, fruit, or chocolate. In the south, it is more of a brioche with candied fruit.

Suppression 
Twelfth Night in the Netherlands became so secularised, rowdy, and boisterous that public celebrations were banned by the Church.

Old Twelfth Night
In some places, particularly South West England, Old Twelfth Night is still celebrated on 17 January. This continues the custom of the Apple Wassail on the date that corresponded to 6 January on the Julian calendar at the time of the change in calendars enacted by the Calendar Act of 1750.

In literature 

It is unknown whether Shakespeare's play Twelfth Night, or What You Will was written to be performed as a Twelfth Night entertainment, since there is no record of the circumstances of its composition. The earliest known performance took place at Middle Temple Hall, one of the Inns of Court, on Candlemas night, 2 February 1602. The play has many elements that are reversed, in the tradition of Twelfth Night, such as a woman Viola dressing as a man, and a servant Malvolio imagining that he can become a nobleman.

Ben Jonson's The Masque of Blackness was performed on 6 January 1605 at the Banqueting House in Whitehall. It was originally entitled The Twelfth Nights Revells. The accompanying Masque, The Masque of Beauty was performed in the same court the Sunday night after the Twelfth Night in 1608.

Robert Herrick's poem Twelfth-Night, or King and Queene, published in 1648, describes the election of king and queen by bean and pea in a plum cake, and the homage done to them by the draining of wassail bowls of "lamb's-wool", a drink of sugar, nutmeg, ginger, and ale.

Charles Dickens' 1843 A Christmas Carol briefly mentions Scrooge and the Ghost of Christmas Present visiting a children's Twelfth Night party.

In chapter 6 of Harrison Ainsworth's 1858 novel Mervyn Clitheroe, the eponymous hero is elected King of festivities at the Twelfth Night celebrations held in Tom Shakeshaft's barn by receiving the slice of plum cake containing the bean; his companion Cissy obtains the pea and becomes queen, and they are seated together in a high corner to view the proceedings. The distribution has been rigged to prevent another person from gaining the role. The festivities include country dances, the introduction of a "Fool Plough", a plough decked with ribands brought into the barn by a dozen mummers together with a grotesque "Old Bessie" (played by a man), and a Fool dressed in animal skins with a fool's hat. The mummers carry wooden swords and perform revelries. The scene in the novel is illustrated by Hablot Knight Browne ("Phiz"). In the course of the evening, the fool's antics cause a fight to break out, but Mervyn restores order. Three bowls of gin punch are disposed of. At eleven o'clock, the young men make the necessary arrangements to see the young ladies safely home across the fields.

"The Dead" — the final, novella-length story in James Joyce's 1914 collection Dubliners — opens on Twelfth Night, or Epiphany Eve, and extends into the early morning hours of Epiphany itself. Critics and writers consider the story "just about the finest short story in the English language" and "one of the greatest short stories ever written". Its adaptations include a play, a Broadway musical, and two films. The story begins at the bustling and sumptuous annual dance hosted by Kate Morkan and Julia Morkan, aunts to Gabriel Conroy, the main character. Throughout the festivities, a series of minor obligations and awkward encounters leaves Gabriel with a sense of unease, inducing self-doubt, or at least doubt in the person he presents himself as. This unease sharpens during a dinner speech in which Gabriel grandiosely ponders whether because "...we are living in a skeptical and, if I may use the phrase, a thought-tormented age", the generation currently coming of age in Ireland will begin to "lack those qualities of humanity, of hospitality, of kindly humor which belonged to an older day." High spirits and singing soon resume. Gabriel and his wife Gretta depart for their hotel in the early morning hours. This destination for Gabriel kindles both erotic possibility and deep love. However, at the hotel, Gretta, moved by a song they had just heard sung at the party, offers a tearful, long-withheld revelation that momentarily shatters Gabriel's feelings of warmth, leaving him shaken and bewildered. After Gretta drifts off to sleep, Gabriel, still rapt in the emotional wake of her revelation, gazes out the window at the falling snow and experiences a profound and unifying epiphany, one that reconciles the fears, doubts, and façades that had haunted him throughout the evening and, he seems to recognise, throughout his life to that point.

See also 
 Christmas Eve
 List of Christmas carols
 Pantomime
 Theophany

References

Further reading
 Primarily subhead Popular Merrymaking under Liturgy and Custom.
 Christmas Trivia edited by Jennie Miller Helderman, Mary Caulkins. Gramercy, 2002
 Marix-Evans, Martin. The Twelve Days of Christmas. Peter Pauper Press, 2002
 Bowler, Gerry. The World Encyclopedia of Christmas. McClelland & Stewart, 2004
 Collins, Ace. Stories Behind the Great Traditions of Christmas. Zondervan, 2003
 Wells, Robin Headlam. Shakespeare's Humanism. Cambridge University Press, 2006
 Fosbrooke, Thomas Dudley c. 1810, Encyclopaedia of Antiquities (Publisher unknown)
 J. Brand, 1813, Popular Antiquities, 2 Vols (London)
 W. Hone, 1830, The Every-Day Book 3 Vols (London), cf Vol I pp 41–61.

Early English sources
(drawn from Hone's Every-Day Book, references as found):
Vox Graculi, 4to, 1623: 6 January, Masking in the Strand, Cheapside, Holbourne, or Fleet-street (London), and eating spice-bread.
The Popish Kingdom, 'Naogeorgus': Baking of the twelfth-cake with a penny in it, the slices distributed to members of the household to give to the poor: whoever finds the penny is proclaimed king among them.
Nichols, Queen Elizabeth's Progresses: An entertainment at Sudley, temp. Elizabeth I, including Melibaeus, king of the bean, and Nisa, queen of the pea.
Pinkerton, Ancient Scottish Poems: Letter from Sir Thomas Randolph to Robert Dudley, 1st Earl of Leicester dated 15 January 1563, mentioning that Lady Flemyng was Queen of the Beene on Twelfth-Day that year.
Ben Jonson, Christmas, His Masque (1616, published 1641): A character 'Baby-cake' is attended by an usher carrying a great cake with a beane and a pease.
Samuel Pepys, Diaries (1659/60): Epiphany Eve party, selecting of King and Queen by a cake (see King cake).

External links 

Epiphany on Catholic Encyclopedia
The Twelve Days of Christmas at The Christian Resource Institute
William Shakespeare's Twelfth Night

Christmastide
January observances
12 (number)